The 1996 TFL Statewide League premiership season was an Australian rules football competition, staged across Tasmania, Australia over twenty two roster rounds and six finals series matches between 6 April and 5 October 1996.
This was the eleventh season of statewide football and the League was known as the Cascade-Boags Draught Super League under a dual commercial naming-rights sponsorship agreement with both Cascade Brewery in Hobart and Boag's Brewery in Launceston.

Participating Clubs
Burnie Dockers Football Club
Clarence District Football Club
Devonport Football Club
Glenorchy District Football Club
Hobart Football Club
Launceston Football Club
New Norfolk District Football Club
North Hobart Football Club
North Launceston Football Club
Sandy Bay Football Club
South Launceston Football Club

1996 TFL Statewide League Club Coaches
Peter German (Burnie Dockers)
Grant Fagan (Clarence)
Andy Goodwin (Devonport)
Paul Hamilton (Glenorchy)
Wayne Petterd & Gary Williamson (Hobart)
Michael Lockman (Launceston)
Darren Dennemann (New Norfolk)
Ricky Hanlon (North Hobart)
Wes Lewis (North Launceston)
Lance Spaulding (Sandy Bay)
Peter Curran (South Launceston)

TFL Statewide League Reserves Grand Final
Burnie Dockers 12.9 (81) v Clarence 9.20 (74) – North Hobart Oval

TFL Statewide League Colts (Under-19's) Grand Final
Devonport 17.18 (120) v Nth Hobart 9.10 (64) – North Hobart Oval

Leading Goalkickers: TFL Statewide League
Justin Plapp (Burnie Dockers) – 98
Jason Gibson (Nth Launceston) – 92
Ken Rainsford (Launceston) – 68
Chris McGurk (Devonport) – 59

Medal Winners
Danny Noonan (Clarence) – William Leitch Medal
Daniel Hulm (Clarence) – Darrel Baldock Medal (Best player in TFL Grand Final)
Brent Thomas (Launceston) – George Watt Medal (Reserves)
Brent Dickson (Hobart) – V.A Geard Medal (Under-19's)

Interstate Matches
Interstate Match (Saturday, 1 June 1996)
VFL 15.18 (108) v Tasmania 13.8 (86) – Att: 35,612 at Melbourne Cricket Ground (Double Header)

1996 TFL Statewide League Ladder

Round 1
(Saturday, 6 April & Monday, 8 April 1996)
Sandy Bay 13.7 (85) v Sth Launceston 12.8 (80) – Att: 762 at North Hobart Oval
Clarence 19.16 (130) v Nth Launceston 19.5 (119) – Att: 1,097 at York Park
Devonport 15.9 (99) v Nth Hobart 4.8 (32) – Att: 1,038 at Devonport Oval
New Norfolk 10.10 (70) v Glenorchy 9.9 (63) – Att: 1,974 at KGV Football Park (Monday)
Burnie Dockers 25.10 (160) v Launceston 8.13 (61) – Att: 963 at Windsor Park (Monday)
Bye: Hobart.

Round 2
(Saturday, 13 April & Sunday, 14 April 1996)
Clarence 20.16 (136) v Nth Hobart 8.6 (54) – Att: 1,291 at Bellerive Oval
New Norfolk 14.15 (99) v Devonport 13.9 (87) – Att: 1,474 at Boyer Oval
Burnie Dockers 19.12 (126) v Glenorchy 4.10 (34) – Att: 1,273 at West Park Oval
Sandy Bay 15.18 (108) v Hobart 14.9 (93) – Att: 1,121 at TCA Ground (Sunday)
Sth Launceston 20.10 (130) v Nth Launceston 17.7 (109) – Att: 1,286 at Youngtown Memorial Ground (Sunday)
Bye: Launceston.

Round 3
(Saturday, 20 April & Sunday, 21 April 1996)
Sth Launceston 12.21 (93) v Nth Hobart 11.8 (74) – Att: 748 at North Hobart Oval
Glenorchy 12.21 (93) v Launceston 4.13 (37) – Att: 897 at KGV Football Park
New Norfolk 13.12 (90) v Clarence 12.16 (88) – Att: 1,897 at Bellerive Oval
Nth Launceston 10.17 (77) v Hobart 5.13 (43) – Att: 910 at York Park
Burnie Dockers 14.12 (96) v Devonport 10.10 (70) – Att: 3,093 at Devonport Oval (Sunday)
Bye: Sandy Bay.

Round 4
(Thursday, 25 April & Saturday, 27 April 1996)
Hobart 15.11 (101) v Nth Hobart 8.15 (63) – Att: 1,204 at North Hobart Oval (Anzac Day)
Nth Launceston 13.16 (94) v Sandy Bay 12.3 (75) – Att: 813 at North Hobart Oval
New Norfolk 19.17 (131) v Sth Launceston 8.9 (57) – Att: 1,572 at Boyer Oval
Launceston 14.13 (97) v Devonport 11.10 (76) – Att: 680 at York Park
Burnie Dockers 17.10 (112) v Clarence 11.16 (82) – Att: 2,622 at West Park Oval
Bye: Glenorchy.

Round 5
(Saturday, 4 May 1996)
Sandy Bay 12.14 (86) v Nth Hobart 9.12 (66) – Att: 1,005 at North Hobart Oval
Clarence 17.19 (121) v Launceston 15.10 (100) – Att: 1,243 at Bellerive Oval
New Norfolk 13.19 (97) v Hobart 7.13 (55) – Att: 1,420 at Boyer Oval
Burnie Dockers 20.14 (134) v Sth Launceston 13.9 (87) – Att: 1,211 at York Park
Glenorchy 15.9 (99) v Devonport 12.12 (84) – Att: 1,086 at Devonport Oval
Bye: Nth Launceston.

Round 6
(Saturday, 11 May & Sunday, 12 May 1996)
Burnie Dockers 18.13 (121) v Hobart 13.8 (86) – Att: 828 at North Hobart Oval
Clarence 14.12 (96) v Glenorchy 12.10 (82) – Att: 1,674 at KGV Football Park
Nth Launceston 25.13 (163) v Nth Hobart 7.9 (51) – Att: 779 at York Park
New Norfolk 12.8 (80) v Sandy Bay 8.14 (62) – Att: 1,148 at North Hobart Oval (Sunday)
Launceston 15.7 (97) v Sth Launceston 9.9 (63) – Att: 861 at Windsor Park (Sunday)
Bye: Devonport.

Round 7
(Saturday, 18 May 1996)
Launceston 17.12 (114) v Hobart 10.16 (76) – Att: 724 at TCA Ground
Clarence 17.6 (108) v Devonport 8.16 (64) – Att: 1,077 at Bellerive Oval
Nth Launceston 19.7 (121) v New Norfolk 11.8 (74) – Att: 1,411 at Boyer Oval
Glenorchy 22.15 (147) v Sth Launceston 6.2 (38) – Att: 710 at Youngtown Memorial Ground
Burnie Dockers 25.13 (163) v Sandy Bay 12.6 (78) – Att: 1,799 at West Park Oval
Bye: Nth Hobart.

Round 8
(Saturday, 25 May & Sunday, 26 May 1996)
Sandy Bay 17.13 (115) v Launceston 13.9 (87) – Att: 955 at Queenborough Oval
Hobart 11.17 (83) v Glenorchy 9.15 (69) – Att: 1,242 at KGV Football Park
Nth Launceston 27.12 (174) v Burnie Dockers 8.10 (58) – Att: 2,557 at York Park
Devonport 12.9 (81) v Sth Launceston 13.3 (81) – Att: 1,126 at Devonport Oval
New Norfolk 23.16 (154) v Nth Hobart 8.10 (58) – Att: 1,304 at North Hobart Oval (Sunday)
Bye: Clarence.
Note: As of 2013, the game at Devonport Oval is the most recent drawn match in the TFL or TSL.

Round 9
(Saturday, 8 June, Sunday, 9 June & Monday, 10 June 1996)
Devonport 14.11 (95) v Hobart 8.7 (55) – Att: 762 at North Hobart Oval
Glenorchy 11.20 (86) v Sandy Bay 3.5 (23) – Att: 988 at KGV Football Park
Burnie Dockers 19.21 (135) v Nth Hobart 6.6 (42) – Att: 1,372 at West Park Oval
Clarence 15.18 (108) v Sth Launceston 16.6 (102) – Att: 693 at York Park (Sunday)
Nth Launceston 17.10 (112) v Launceston 11.8 (74) – Att: 1,569 at York Park (Monday)
Bye: New Norfolk.

Round 10
(Saturday, 15 June 1996)
Launceston 17.12 (114) v Nth Hobart 15.9 (99) – Att: 559 at North Hobart Oval
Clarence 21.13 (139) v Hobart 7.11 (53) – Att: 1,081 at Bellerive Oval
Burnie Dockers 17.10 (112) v New Norfolk 15.10 (100) – Att: 1,444 at Boyer Oval
Nth Launceston 19.9 (123) v Glenorchy 9.12 (66) – Att: 1,137 at York Park
Devonport 14.13 (97) v Sandy Bay 10.11 (71) – Att: 1,201 at Devonport Oval
Bye: Sth Launceston.

Round 11
(Saturday, 22 June & Sunday, 23 June 1996)
Hobart 17.10 (112) v Sth Launceston 12.11 (83) – Att: 614 at TCA Ground
Glenorchy 19.10 (124) v Nth Hobart 11.11 (77) – Att: 939 at KGV Football Park
New Norfolk 21.9 (135) v Launceston 13.11 (89) – Att: 770 at Windsor Park
Devonport 11.11 (77) v Nth Launceston 10.8 (68) – Att: 2,122 at Devonport Oval (Sunday)
Clarence 18.19 (127) v Sandy Bay 11.8 (74) – Att: 1,058 at North Hobart Oval (Sunday)
Bye: Burnie Dockers.

Round 12
(Saturday, 29 June & Sunday, 30 June 1996)
Devonport 19.17 (131) v Nth Hobart 11.10 (76) – Att: 602 at North Hobart Oval
Nth Launceston 14.8 (92) v Clarence 11.13 (79) – Att: 1,450 at Bellerive Oval
Sth Launceston 13.12 (90) v Sandy Bay 5.6 (36) – Att: 451 at Youngtown Memorial Ground
Launceston 14.9 (93) v Burnie Dockers 13.13 (91) – Att: 955 at West Park Oval
New Norfolk 13.10 (88) v Glenorchy 12.11 (83) – Att: 1,591 at Boyer Oval (Sunday)
Bye: Hobart.

Round 13
(Saturday, 6 July & Sunday, 7 July 1996)
Sandy Bay 21.12 (138) v Hobart 16.9 (105) – Att: 871 at Queenborough Oval
Glenorchy 13.18 (96) v Burnie Dockers 10.12 (72) – Att: 1,540 at KGV Football Park
Devonport 15.17 (107) v New Norfolk 4.11 (35) – Att: 960 at Devonport Oval
Clarence 22.10 (142) v Nth Hobart 10.12 (72) – Att: 870 at North Hobart Oval (Sunday)
Nth Launceston 13.15 (93) v Sth Launceston 9.6 (60) – Att: 2,016 at York Park (Sunday)
Bye: Launceston.

Round 14
(Saturday, 13 July & Sunday, 14 July 1996)
Nth Launceston 14.11 (95) v Hobart 8.6 (54) – Att: 663 at North Hobart Oval
Sth Launceston 14.13 (97) v Nth Hobart 8.8 (56) – Att: 544 at Youngtown Memorial Ground
Glenorchy 16.13 (109) v Launceston 10.10 (70) – Att: 798 at Windsor Park
Clarence 19.19 (133) v New Norfolk 4.7 (31) – Att: 1,676 at Boyer Oval (Sunday)
Burnie Dockers 10.13 (73) v Devonport 6.11 (47) – Att: 5,078 at West Park Oval (Sunday)
Bye: Sandy Bay.

Round 15
(Saturday, 20 July & Sunday, 21 July 1996)
Clarence 12.12 (84) v Burnie Dockers 11.6 (72) – Att: 1,511 at Bellerive Oval
Nth Launceston 18.19 (127) v Sandy Bay 12.9 (81) – Att: 726 at York Park
New Norfolk 19.9 (123) v Sth Launceston 13.8 (86) – Att: 665 at Youngtown Memorial Ground
Devonport 37.9 (231) v Launceston 10.6 (66) – Att: 1,591 at Devonport Oval
Hobart 11.16 (82) v Nth Hobart 10.7 (67) – Att: 1,125 at North Hobart Oval (Sunday)
Bye: Glenorchy.

Round 16
(Saturday, 27 July & Sunday, 28 July 1996)
New Norfolk 12.21 (93) v Hobart 13.6 (84) – Att: 1,694 at North Hobart Oval
Glenorchy 15.11 (101) v Devonport 10.9 (69) – Att: 1,018 at KGV Football Park
Clarence 13.14 (92) v Launceston 7.12 (54) – Att: 497 at York Park
Burnie Dockers 22.22 (154) v Sth Launceston 8.5 (53) – Att: 1,448 at West Park Oval
Nth Hobart 15.14 (104) v Sandy Bay 13.9 (87) – Att: 705 at North Hobart Oval (Sunday)
Bye: Nth Launceston.

Round 17
(Saturday, 3 August & Sunday, 4 August 1996)
Nth Launceston 16.13 (109) v Nth Hobart 5.4 (34) – Att: 645 at North Hobart Oval
New Norfolk 17.10 (112) v Sandy Bay 4.5 (29) – Att: 886 at Boyer Oval
Burnie Dockers 14.18 (102) v Hobart 0.5 (5) – Att: 808 at West Park Oval *
Clarence 11.6 (72) v Glenorchy 8.5 (53) – Att: 1,318 at Bellerive Oval (Sunday)
Launceston 14.7 (91) v Sth Launceston 7.8 (50) – Att: 617 at York Park (Sunday)
Bye: Devonport.
Note: Hobart becomes the first TFL club to record a goalless match since Clarence at KGV in 1958.

Round 18
(Saturday, 10 August 1996)
Burnie Dockers 18.16 (124) v Sandy Bay 4.9 (33) – Att: 590 at North Hobart Oval
Sth Launceston 12.6 (78) v Glenorchy 10.6 (66) – Att: 764 at KGV Football Park
Nth Launceston 20.14 (134) v New Norfolk 12.5 (77) – Att: 1,341 at York Park
Launceston 17.15 (117) v Hobart 9.10 (64) – Att: 399 at Windsor Park *
Clarence 19.8 (122) v Devonport 8.6 (54) – Att: 1,390 at Devonport Oval
Bye: Nth Hobart.
Note: Official attendance of 399 is the lowest recorded attendance in the history of Statewide League football.

Round 19
(Saturday, 17 August & Sunday, 18 August 1996)
Hobart 10.18 (78) v Glenorchy 9.10 (64) – Att: 1,173 at North Hobart Oval
New Norfolk 14.17 (101) v Nth Hobart 1.3 (9) – Att: 841 at Boyer Oval
Launceston 9.10 (64) v Sandy Bay 3.8 (26) – Att: 402 at Windsor Park
Devonport 14.7 (91) v Sth Launceston 7.7 (49) – Att: 678 at Youngtown Memorial Ground (Sunday)
Burnie Dockers 10.13 (73) v Nth Launceston 6.4 (40) – Att: 2,531 at West Park Oval (Sunday)
Bye: Clarence.

Round 20
(Saturday, 24 August & Sunday, 25 August 1996)
Burnie Dockers 24.20 (164) v Nth Hobart 10.9 (69) – Att: 548 at North Hobart Oval
Clarence 20.16 (136) v Sth Launceston 12.12 (84) – Att: 1,001 at Bellerive Oval
Nth Launceston 19.22 (136) v Launceston 8.5 (53) – Att: 1,088 at York Park
Devonport 16.16 (112) v Hobart 6.5 (41) – Att: 1,082 at Devonport Oval
Glenorchy 19.18 (132) v Sandy Bay 4.10 (34) – Att: 782 at North Hobart Oval (Sunday)
Bye: New Norfolk.

Round 21
(Saturday, 31 August & Sunday, 1 September 1996)
Devonport 19.9 (123) v Sandy Bay 7.9 (51) – Att: 992 at North Hobart Oval
Nth Launceston 15.15 (105) v Glenorchy 14.15 (99) – Att: 1,012 at KGV Football Park
Launceston 24.11 (155) v Nth Hobart 7.10 (52) – Att: 486 at Windsor Park
Burnie Dockers 17.19 (121) v New Norfolk 12.12 (84) – Att: 1,924 at West Park Oval
Clarence 35.17 (227) v Hobart 5.4 (34) – Att: 804 at North Hobart Oval (Sunday) *
Bye: Sth Launceston.
Note: This match was Hobart's 1000th TANFL/TFL match (the club's 1,016th senior match overall).

Round 22
(Saturday, 7 September & Sunday, 8 September 1996)
Glenorchy 33.15 (213) v Nth Hobart 11.8 (74) – Att: 837 at North Hobart Oval
Clarence 19.19 (133) v Sandy Bay 5.8 (38) – Att: 2,243 at Bellerive Oval
New Norfolk 19.12 (126) v Launceston 14.9 (93) – Att: 867 at Boyer Oval
Sth Launceston 16.16 (112) v Hobart 2.12 (24) – Att: 490 at York Park
Nth Launceston 17.11 (113) v Devonport 9.11 (65) – Att: 1,509 at York Park (Sunday)
Bye: Burnie Dockers.

Elimination Final
(Sunday, 15 September 1996)
Devonport: 4.1 (25) | 9.3 (57) | 16.4 (100) | 20.5 (125)
New Norfolk: 3.2 (20) | 9.5 (59) | 11.9 (75) | 13.10 (88)
Attendance: 2,045 at North Hobart Oval

Qualifying Final
(Sunday, 15 September 1996)
Nth Launceston: 6.1 (37) | 7.1 (43) | 10.10 (70) | 11.12 (78)
Burnie Dockers: 3.2 (20) | 4.5 (29) | 6.5 (41) | 9.11 (65)
Attendance: 3,006 at West Park Oval

Second Semi Final
(Saturday, 21 September 1996)
Clarence Roos: 5.2 (32) | 9.7 (61) | 11.11 (77) | 18.15 (123)
Nth Launceston: 1.5 (11) | 3.8 (26) | 8.13 (61) | 10.14 (74)
Attendance: 2,100 at North Hobart Oval

First Semi Final
(Sunday, 22 September 1996)
Burnie Dockers: 8.2 (50) | 11.6 (72) | 15.9 (99) | 18.9 (117)
Devonport Blues: 3.5 (23) | 9.6 (60) | 12.8 (80) | 13.9 (87)
Attendance: 5,322 at West Park Oval

Preliminary Final
(Sunday, 29 September 1996)
Burnie Dockers: 3.3 (21) | 5.5 (35) | 11.7 (73) | 14.9 (93)
Nth Launceston: 2.5 (17) | 4.7 (31) | 5.9 (39) | 10.12 (72)
Attendance: 2,061 at York Park

Grand Final
(Saturday, 5 October 1996) (ABC-TV highlights: 1996 TFL Grand Final)
Clarence Roos: 3.4 (22) | 7.10 (52) | 12.14 (86) | 14.17 (101)
Burnie Dockers: 2.3 (15) | 4.5 (29) | 7.9 (51) | 10.14 (74)
Attendance: 12,352 at North Hobart Oval

Source: All scores and statistics courtesy of the Hobart Mercury, Launceston Examiner and North West Advocate publications.

Tasmanian Football League seasons